Martin Pascal Hubert Strens (28 March 1807, in Roermond – 22 July 1875, in Maastricht) was a Dutch politician and Ministers of Foreign Affairs of the Netherlands between 1861 and 1862.

See also
List of Dutch politicians

1807 births
1875 deaths
Ministers of Foreign Affairs of the Netherlands
Ministers of Justice of the Netherlands
Members of the House of Representatives (Netherlands)
Independent politicians in the Netherlands
Dutch civil servants
University of Liège alumni
People from Roermond
Commanders of the Order of the Netherlands Lion